is the 16th single by Japanese idol girl group NMB48. It was released on 28 December 2016. It reached number-one on the weekly Oricon Singles Chart with 266,813 copies sold. It also reached the second place on the Billboard Japan Hot 100.

Track listing

Chart performance

Oricon

Billboard Japan

References

2016 singles
2016 songs
Japanese-language songs
NMB48 songs
Oricon Weekly number-one singles